Maidan (Punjabi) is a 1982 Pakistani, action and a musical film directed by Masud Butt and produced by Jamshed Zafar. Film starring actor Sudhir, Sultan Rahi, Mustafa Qureshi, Aasia, and Sawan.

Cast 
 Sudhir as Jagga
 Sultan Rahi as Nadir
 Mustafa Qureshi as Shikra
 Aasia
 Chakori
 Sawaan
 Ilyas Kashmiri
 Adeeb
 Bahar
 Naghma
 Zahir Shah
 Javed Hassan
 Iqbal Durrani
 Khawar Butt
 Veena
 Seema

Soundtrack
The music of Maidan is composed by Tafoo with lyrics penned by Hazeen Qadri.

Track listing

References

External links 
 Sultan Rahi
 

Pakistani action films
Pakistani fantasy films
1982 films
Punjabi-language Pakistani films
1980s Punjabi-language films